Eleven articles of impeachment against United States President Andrew Johnson were adopted by the United States House of Representatives on March 2 and 3, 1868 as part of the impeachment of Johnson. An impeachment resolution had previously been adopted by the House on February 24, 1868. Each of the articles were a separate charge which Johnson would be tried for in his subsequent impeachment trial before the United States Senate.

The primary matter addressed by the articles of impeachment was President Johnson's effort to, in disregard for the Tenure of Office Act, dismiss Secretary of War Edwin Stanton and appoint Lorenzo Thomas as ad interim secretary of war. This effort had been the direct event which triggered Johnson's impeachment. However, several other allegations were also included in the eleven articles of impeachment, including an alleged violation by Johnson of the Command of Army Act and an allegation that Johnson attempted "to bring into disgrace, ridicule, hatred, contempt, and reproach the Congress of the United States."

In the impeachment trial, Senators voted on May 16, 1868, on their verdict for article eleven. Thirty-five senators found Johnson guilty and nineteen finding him innocent. This meant that the Senate acquitted Johnson, failing by a single vote to reach the two-thirds majority required to convict. On May 26, 1868, the Senate voted with identical results on articles two and three. The Senate then voted to adjourn sine die, ending the trial without voting on the remaining eight articles.

Background
Andrew Johnson ascended to the United States presidency after the 1865 assassination of Republican president Abraham Lincoln. Johnson, a Southern Democrat, had been elected vice president in 1864 on a unity ticket with Lincoln. As president, Johnson held open disagreements with the Republican majority of United States House and Senate (the two chambers of the United States Congress).

In 1861 and 1862, the Conspiracies Acts of 1861 and 1862 had been passed. The first of these acts, passed in 1861, would later be cited in some of the articles of impeachment against Johnson.

In the late summer of 1866, President Johnson embarked his national "Swing Around the Circle" speaking tour, in part to campaign for Democrats ahead of the 1866 United States elections. The tour backfired on Johnson, resulting in damaging reports in newspapers across the nation of his undisciplined and vitriolic speeches as well as ill-advised confrontations with hecklers. Contrary to Johnson's hopes, the 1866 elections produced veto-proof Republican Party majorities in both houses of the United States Congress. As a result, Radicals were able to take control of Reconstruction, passing a series of Reconstruction Acts—each one over the president's veto—addressing requirements for Southern states to be fully restored to the Union. The first of these acts divided those states, excluding Johnson's home state of Tennessee, into five military districts, and each state's government was put under the control of the U.S. military. Additionally, these states were required to enact new constitutions, ratify the Fourteenth Amendment, and guarantee voting rights for black males.

On March 1867, despite taking formal issue with the Command of Army Act, arguing that it is unconstitutional, President Johnson signed the appropriations bill containing the act. An alleged violation of act would later be the subject of the ninth article of impeachment that was adopted against Johnson.

Early efforts to impeach Johnson

Johnson's conflict with the Republican-controlled Congress led to a number of efforts being taken since 1866, particularly by Radical Republicans, to impeach Johnson. On January 7, 1867, the House of Representatives voted to launch of an impeachment inquiry run by the House Committee on the Judiciary, which resulted in a November 25, 1867 5–4 vote by the committee to recommend impeachment. However, on December 7, 1867, vote, the full House rejected impeachment by a 108–57 vote. On January 22, 1868, the House approved by a vote of 103–37 a resolution launching a second impeachment inquiry run by House Select Committee on Reconstruction.

Tenure of Office Act and Johnson’s effort to dismiss Edwin Stanton
In 1867, the Congress had passed the Tenure of Office Act and enacted it by successfully overriding Johnson's veto. The law was written with the intent of both curbing Johnson's power and protecting United States Secretary of War Edwin Stanton from being removed from his office unilaterally by Johnson. Stanton was a strongly aligned with the Radical Republicans, and acted as an executive branch ally to the Reconstruction policies of the congressional Radical Republicans. The Tenure of Office Act restricted the power of the United States president to suspend Senate-confirmed federal branch officers while the Senate was not in session. The Tenure of Office Act was put in place to prevent the president from dismissing an officer that had been previously appointed with the advice and consent of the Senate without the Senate's approval to remove them. Per the law, if the president dismissed such an officer when the Senate was in recess, and the Senate voted upon reconvening against ratifying the removal, the president would be required to reinstate the individual. Johnson, during a Senate recess in August 1867, suspended Stanton pending the next session of the Senate and appointed Ulysses S. Grant as acting secretary of war. When the Senate convened on January 13, 1868, it refused to ratify the removal by a vote of 35–6. However, disregarding this vote, on February 21, 1868, President Johnson attempted to replace Stanton with Lorenzo Thomas in an apparent violation of the Tenure of Office Act.

The Tenure of Office Act was officially titled "an act regulating the tenure of certain civil office", and was referred to by such name in the articles of impeachment that were adopted in Johnson's impeachment.

House passage of the impeachment resolution

The same day that Johnson attempted to replace Stanton with Thomas, a one sentence resolution to impeach Johnson, written by John Covode, was referred to the House Select Committee on Reconstruction (which was running the second impeachment inquiry against Johnson). On February 22, the House Select Committee on Reconstruction released a report which recommended Johnson be impeached for high crimes and misdemeanors, and also reported an amended version of the impeachment resolution. On February 24, the House of Representatives voted 126–47 to impeach Johnson for "high crimes and misdemeanors". Johnson's impeachment the first of a United States president. It was also only the sixth federal impeachment in American history.

Drafting of the articles

After the passage of the impeachment resolution, the House's attention turned to the adoption of articles of impeachment which the Senate would try Johnson on. The approach of having the vote to impeach be an entirely separate vote from the adoption of article(s) of impeachment differs from the approach that has been practiced in more recent United States federal impeachments, in which impeachment has occurred directly through the adoption of article(s) of impeachment. However, the manner in which Johnson was impeached appears to have been the standard order of procedure for nineteenth century federal impeachments in the United States, as each of the five previous impeachments of federal officials that had led to a Senate trial had been conducted the same way, with votes to impeach occurring before votes on articles of impeachment.

After the vote to impeach Johnson, Thaddeus Stevens submitted a pair of resolutions that both created a two-person committee tasked with presenting to the Senate bar the impeachment resolution that had been passed and informing the Senate that the House would "in due time" exhibit specific articles of impeachment, and which also created a seven-person committee to prepare and report articles of impeachment. The resolutions gave that seven-person committee the power to subpoena people, papers, and records, and to record sworn testimony. After procedural votes, the House approved both of Stevens' resolutions in a single 124–42 vote. No members of the Republican Party voted against it, while no members of the Democratic Party voted for it. Before the House adjourned for the evening, Speaker Schuyler Colfax appointed John Bingham and Thaddeus Stevens to the two-person committee tasked with informing the Senate of Johnson's impeachment, and also appointed John Bingham, George S. Boutwell, and Thaddeus Stevens (all of whom had been members of the House Select Committee on Reconstruction) along with George Washington Julian, House Committee on the Judiciary Chairman James F. Wilson, John A. Logan, and Hamilton Ward to the seven-person committee tasked with writing the articles of impeachment. The committee held their first meeting later that day.

The committee held their meetings in the room in the United States Capitol that was usually utilized by the House Judiciary Committee. They set a quick timetable for themselves in which they intended to release articles of impeachment within two days and have them approved by the House and presented to the Senate within six days.

Thaddeus Stevens would at the time, in an interview, describe the subcommittee's approach as reflective of its members' egotism. Stevens characterized the process as having seen each member first individually write their own articles of impeachment, with the committee then sorting through the resulting proposed articles and aggregating them together. Stevens was concerned that this process could lead the committee to disagree over which articles to adopt, with members playing favorites to ones that they had written.

Part of the process the committee took was also collecting evidence and taking testimony. On February 26, 1868, the committee took testimony from Lorenzo Thomas, William H. Emory (the head of the Washington garrison), and from Emory's own second-in-command.

It was decided by the committee members to not include any of the charges that had been recommended by the majority report of the House Judiciary Committee in November 1867 at the end of the first impeachment inquiry against Johnson. The New York Times reported that inclusion of those claims would be seen as fatally harming the, "moral and legal effect of the prosecution." The articles ultimately produced by the committee were narrow in their focus and were legalistic and modeled on criminal indictment. This was likely in direct reaction to the failure of broad scope of the allegations cited in the failed 1867 effort to impeach Johnson. 

The committee reached disagreement on how many articles of impeachment to adopt. Some wanted as few as three, while others wanted as many as six. However, pressures ultimately prevailed in favor of creating a larger number of articles, and eight articles were ultimately created. This was a possible misstep, as the articles, which all focused on Johnson's actions regarding Secretary Stanton, overlapped with one another creating unneeded complexity, as a single impeachment article could have sufficed. Eight concerned the violation of the Tenure of Office Act, while the ninth accused him of violating the Command of Army Act by pressuring General William H. Emory to ignore Acting Secretary of War Grant and to instead take orders directly from Johnson.
 
Thaddeus Stevens, a Radical Republican himself, felt that Radical Republicans on the committee were yielding too much to moderate Republicans to limit the scope of the violations of law that the articles of impeachment would charge Johnson with. He wrote Benjamin F. Butler, proposing that, while Stevens worked to add two more additional articles to the seven already written by the committee, Butler would write his own separate article of impeachment from outside of the committee. Butler accepted this proposal.

Adoption of the articles

March 2, 1868

On behalf of the committee of seven, Boutwell delivered ten proposed articles of impeachment to the House on February 29, 1868. Many Radical Republicans felt that the articles, focusing so narrowly on two specific actions of Johnson (his actions regarding his effort to dismiss Stanton and his alleged violation of the Command of Army Act), excluding the many other misdeeds of Johnson's that they took issue with. When the articles were presented, many House Republicans were disappointed by the articles that had been produced, seeing them as poorly conceived. Some members urged that the House of Representatives not proceed to debate the articles on March 1 and 2, as scheduled, but instead slow down the process of adopting articles in order to remedy the deficiencies that they held the series of proposed articles possessed. On March 2, the House voted to ratify the nine articles of impeachment referred to it by the committee of seven.

At the close of the March 2 debate, Thaddeus Stevens took the floor to criticize the committee of seven for going too easy on Johnson, declaring,  Stevens further alleged that the committee had a determination "to deal gently with the president" and had omitted from the articles many crimes, instead including only "the most trifling crimes and misdemeanors." He argued that the articles put before the house had failed to address just how much Johnson had imperiled the governing structure of the United States. He, nevertheless, declared that each of the committee's articles were still justified charges, and delivered long remarks on how each should be approved in order order to rid the nation of the "unfortunate man" occupying its presidency.

When Stevens finished his remarks, Boutwell brought forward revised versions of the impeachment articles, with there now only being nine articles proposed by the committee. The House rejected a number of motions to consider adding further articles before Benjamin Butler submitted his own lengthy impeachment article, inspired by Stevens' request to him, which stated no clear violation of law, but instead charged Johnson with attempting, "to bring into disgrace, ridicule, hatred, contempt, and reproach the Congress of the United States." The article written in response to speeches that Johnson had made during his "Swing Around the Circle". Butler's remarks on his impeachment resolution were very long, and this frustrated many, even including Stevens. The House quickly rejected Butler's article before approving all nine articles from the committee one by one.

March 3, 1868

After the March 2 adoption of articles of impeachment, the House appointed the impeachment managers that would serve as prosecutors in the impeachment trial before the Senate. The following day, in hopes of strengthening the case that they would bring before the Senate, the impeachment managers requested that the House consider additional charges. First, the managers reported the article previously proposed by Butler, which they reintroduced as the tenth article. It was approved. After this, an eleventh article drafted by Thaddeus Stevens and James F. Wilson was approved without debate by an overwhelming margin. The eleventh article accused Johnson of violating his oath of office to "take care that the laws be faithfully executed" by declaring that the 39th United States Congress was unconstitutional because it only represented some of the United States (with unreconstructed states being excluded) and therefore lacked legislative powers or the power to propose amendments to the Constitution of the United States.

Table detailing the votes individual House members

Articles

Article one

Text of article one

Summary of article one
The first article alleged that Johnson's February 21, 1868 order to dismiss Secretary of War Stanton violated the Tenure of Office Act.

House adoption vote for article one

Role of article one in the impeachment trial
When it came time to vote on the articles of impeachment, it was decided that article one would be skipped. This was because Republican Senator John Sherman announced that he would vote to acquit on that charge if it were brought to a vote. Since Sherman had chaired the Senate committee that had written the Tenure of Office Act, it was believed that other senators would heed his judgement and vote to acquit on this charge.  Sherman did, however, declare that he would vote for articles two and three which alleged that the ad interim appointment of Thomas violated the Tenure of Office Act. Sherman did not give clear reasons for his opposition to conviction on article one nor his support for conviction on articles two and three.

Article two

Text of article two

Summary of article two
The second article charged that the appointment of Lorenzo Thomas as secretary of war ad interim was done in violation of the Tenure of Office Act. The article charged that Johnson had violated the Tenure of Office Act by sending "a letter of authority" to Lorenzo Thomas regarding his appointment to be Secretary of War ad interim when there was, in fact, no legal vacancy because Secretary Stanton had been removed in violation of the Tenure of Office Act. The second article's charge differed very little from that of the third article.

House adoption vote for article two

Senate vote on the verdict for article two

Article three

Text of article three

Summary of article three
Like many of the other articles, the third article related to Johnson violating the Tenure of Office Act by attempting to dismiss Secretary of War Stanton. Like the second article, the third article alleged that the appointment of Thomas as secretary of war ad interim was done with intent to violate the Tenure of Office Act. It argued that Johnson had moved to appoint Lorenzo Thomas to be ad interim Secretary of War when there was, in fact, no legal vacancy because Secretary Stanton had been removed in violation of the Tenure of Office Act. The third article's charge differed very little from that of the second article.

House adoption vote for article three

Senate vote on the verdict for article three

Article four

Text of article four

Summary of article four
The fourth article, like many of the other articles, related to Johnson violating the Tenure of Office Act by attempting to dismiss Secretary of War Stanton. Like articles five, six, seven, and eight, it also alleged conspiracy. It alleged that Johnson had violated the 1861 federal conspiracy statute by working with Lorenzo Thomas and others to oust Secretary Stanton, obstructing him from being able to carry out the duties of his office as secretary of war.

House adoption vote for article four

Article five

Text of article five

Summary of article five
Like many of the other articles, the article five related to Johnson violating the Tenure of Office Act by attempting to dismiss Secretary of War Stanton. Similar to article four, article five dealt with Johnson allegedly conspiring with Thomas to oust Stanton. It specifically charged that Johnson had, with Thomas, used force to "prevent and hinder the execution" of the Tenure of Office Act by ousting Secretary Stanton.

House adoption vote for article five

Article six

Text of article six

Summary of article six
Like many of the other articles, article six related to Johnson violating the Tenure of Office Act by attempting to dismiss Secretary of War Stanton. The article alleged that Johnson and Lorenzo Johnson had conspired to oust Stanton and to forcefully seize the property of the United States Department of War. It charged that this was a violation of both the 1861 federal conspiracy statute and the Tenure of Office Act. Article seven effectively alleged the same conspiracy as article six, but without the allegation of a use of force.

House adoption vote for article six

Senate vote on the verdict for article six

Article seven

Text of article seven

Summary of article seven
Article seven, like many of the other articles, relates to Johnson violating the Tenure of Office Act by attempting to dismiss Secretary of War Stanton. Article seven alleges that Johnson and Lorenzo Thomas had conspired to oust Stanton with the extend of acting "by force to seize, take, and possess the property of the United States in the Department of War" under control of Stanton, thereby committing a high misdemeanor in office by acting in violation of both the Tenure of Office Act. Article seven effectively alleged the same conspiracy as article six, but without the allegation of a use of force.

House adoption vote for article seven

Article eight

Text of article eight

Summary of article eight
Article eight charged that Johnson had unlawfully sought to seize the property of the Department of War by moving to remove Secretary Stanton and appoint Lorenzo Thomas. The article was like many others in that it related to Johnson violating the Tenure of Office Act by attempting to dismiss Secretary of War Stanton. However, its allegation that the appointment of Thomas ad interim was done with the intent of unlawfully controlling property of the Department of War was unique among the articles of impeachment.

House adoption vote for article eight

Article nine

Text of article nine

Summary of article nine
The ninth article focused on charging that Johnson had violated the Command of Army Act by unlawfully instructing Major General William H. Emory to ignore as unconstitutional act, which required that all orders issued by the President and Secretary of War "relating to military operations ... shall be issued through the General of the Army". This article was not supported by the testimony of Emory.

House adoption vote for article nine

Article ten
Unlike the first nine article of impeachment, the tenth article was not written by the select committee that had been appointed for the express purpose of writing article of impeachment. Instead, it was individually authored by Congressman Benjamin Butler, who did not serve on that select committee. It was initially rejected by the House when Butler presented it on March 2, 1868, but was passed the following day at the request of the impeachment managers.

Butler had, when first presenting the article on March 2, 1868, argued that it was similar to one of the articles impeachment adopted against sixty years earlier against Supreme Court Justice Samuel Chase.

Text of article ten

Summary of article ten
Article ten deals with remarks made by Johnson during the Swing Around the Circle. It charged that Johnson had attempted, "to bring into disgrace, ridicule, hatred, contempt, and reproach the Congress of the United States."  It alleged that he had "with a loud voice, certain intemperate, inflammatory, and scandalous harangues, and did therein utter loud threats and bitter menaces ... against Congress [and] the laws of the United States duly enacted thereby, amid the cries, jeers and laughter of the multitudes then assembled and within hearing." The tenth article did not cite a clear violation of the law.

House rejection on March 2, 1868

House adoption vote for article ten

Role of article ten in the impeachment trial
Several witnesses were brought in during the impeachment managers' prosecutorial presentation to testify on the speeches cited in the tenth article of impeachment. Several individuals, largely reporters, testified about the cited speeches by Johnson. For instance, James O. Clephane and others were called by the prosecution to testify on the speech that Johnson had made in Washington, D.C. on August 18, 1866. Clephane, who had at the time of the speech made a report on it as a phonographic reporter, testified with other witnesses that the wording of their reports had been corrected by the president's private secretary, Colonel W. G. Moore. In his testimony, Moore testified that the corrections made by him were corrections he had made without the approval of Johnson, and only related to the language used, and did not change the sense of the reports. During the defense's presentation, witnesses were also called to testify about the cited speeches. For example, William W. Armstrong, then a reporter for The Plain Dealer, testified about Johnson's speech in Cleveland, with the defense aiming to prove that Johnson was constantly interrupted by the crowd during that speech and that many disorderly individuals were in the audience. Others were called by the defense to testify about other speeches that were cited in article ten.

Article eleven

Text of article eleven

Summary of article eleven
The eleventh article effectively provided a restatement of the first nine articles. Like the first eight articles, the eleventh article related to Johnson violating the Tenure of Office Act by attempting to dismiss Secretary of War Stanton. It also charged Johnson of violating his oath of office to "take care that the laws be faithfully executed" by unlawfully and unconstitutionally challenging the authority of the 39th Congress to legislate due to unreconstructed southern states had not been readmitted to the Union. It also charged that Johnson had contrived to fail to execute the provision of the Command of Army Act, a provision 1867 Army Appropriations Act which directed executive orders to the military be issued through the General of the Army; and prevented the execution of an act entitled "An act to provide for the more efficient government of the rebel states". This meant that this article combined the alleged criminal offense related to Johnson's effort to dismiss Stanton was combined with a political offense. The article also accused Johnson of acting to prevent prevent the execution of “An act to provide for the more efficient government of the Rebel States,” a piece of legislation relating to the unreconstructed states, and also included the allegation that Johnson had violated the Command of Army Act.

It was hoped by the impeachment managers that the article might succeed if others failed by amalgamating many of the various allegations featured in other articles, with the theory being that senators who accepted one charge but not others would all vote for a single resolution combining those charges. In no preceding United States federal impeachments had there been a similar "catch-all" article of impeachment combining many allegations into one article. However, some of the subsequent federal impeachments have featured similar articles combining multiple allegations into a single article.

House adoption vote for article eleven

Notes
 Schuyler Colfax was serving as Speaker of the House. Per House rules, "the Speaker is not required to vote in ordinary legislative proceedings, except when such vote would be decisive or when the House is engaged in voting by ballot."

References

Impeachment of Andrew Johnson